Bangor is a city in Van Buren County in the U.S. state of Michigan.  The population was 1,885 at the 2010 census. The city is located in the northeast corner of Bangor Township, but is politically independent.

It was first organized as a town in 1854.

Geography

Demographics

2010 census
As of the census of 2010, there were 1,885 people, 707 households, and 464 families living in the city. The racial makeup of the city was 72.9% White, 11.8% African American, 0.5% Native American, 0.7% Asian, 8.6% from other races, and 5.4% from two or more races. Hispanic or Latino of any race were 14.4% of the population.

There were 707 households, of which 39.9% had children under the age of 18 living with them, 38.2% were married couples living together, 21.2% had a female householder with no husband present, 6.2% had a male householder with no wife present, and 34.4% were non-families. 29.3% of all households were made up of individuals, and 10.6% had someone living alone who was 65 years of age or older. The average household size was 2.66 and the average family size was 3.23.

The median age in the city was 32.9 years. 30% of residents were under the age of 18; 8.7% were between the ages of 18 and 24; 24.6% were from 25 to 44; 24.9% were from 45 to 64; and 11.9% were 65 years of age or older. The gender makeup of the city was 47.6% male and 52.4% female.

2000 census
As of the census of 2000, there were 1,933 people, 722 households, and 487 families living in the city. The racial makeup of the city was 75.58% White, 12.73% African American, 1.09% Native American, 0.21% Asian, 7.92% from other races, and 2.48% from two or more races. Hispanic or Latino of any race were 12.16% of the population.

There were 722 households, out of which 35.5% had children under the age of 18 living with them, 42.2% were married couples living together, 20.2% had a female householder with no husband present, and 32.5% were non-families. 28.1% of all households were made up of individuals, and 13.0% had someone living alone who was 65 years of age or older.  The average household size was 2.66 and the average family size was 3.23.

In the city, the population was spread out, with 30.7% under the age of 18, 10.1% from 18 to 24, 25.9% from 25 to 44, 19.8% from 45 to 64, and 13.5% who were 65 years of age or older.  The median age was 33 years. For every 100 females, there were 89.9 males.  For every 100 females age 18 and over, there were 82.2 males.

The median income for a household in the city was $28,165, and the median income for a family was $34,500. Males had a median income of $27,159 versus $20,850 for females. The per capita income for the city was $14,925.  About 13.2% of families and 16.3% of the population were below the poverty line, including 19.3% of those under age 18 and 16.2% of those age 65 or over.

Education
The Bangor Public Schools consists of one elementary school (grades K-4), Bangor Middle School (grades 5–8), and Bangor High School (grades 9-12). The Bangor District has an Adult Education building as well. The Bangor Vikings compete in the Southwest 10 Conference for sports.

Trinity Lutheran School is a Christian grade school of the Wisconsin Evangelical Lutheran Synod in Bangor.

Notable people

Grover C. Dillman, engineer and Michigan state highway commissioner from 1929 to 1933; born in Bangor (1889-1979)
 Peter Gent, author of North Dallas Forty; wide receiver with the Dallas Cowboys; Big Ten Conference Medal of Honor (1964); born and died in Bangor (1942-2011) leading Bangor High School to a Michigan state basketball championship in 1960.
Rachel Lloyd, chemist, lived in Bangor from 1863 to 1865 when her husband managed a saw mill, salt works and barrel factory
 Hall Overton, composer, jazz pianist, and music teacher; born in Bangor (1920-1972)
 Thelma Terry, bandleader and bassist (Thelma Terry and Her Playboys); born in Bangor (1901-1966)

Transportation
Amtrak train service is available at the Bangor depot.
Local bus service is provided by Van Buren Public Transit.

References

Notes

Sources

Cities in Van Buren County, Michigan
Kalamazoo–Portage metropolitan area
Populated places established in 1854
1854 establishments in Michigan